The Melbourne Whalers are an Australian junior ice hockey team based in Melbourne, Victoria playing in the Australian Junior Ice Hockey League. They represent one of the two junior ice hockey teams from Victoria currently playing in the AJIHL, which is the most elite level for ice hockey at a national level for ages between 16–20 years old.

History

AJIHL

The Melbourne Blackhawks were founded 18 September 2012 following the announcement by Ice Hockey Australia of the formation of the Australian Junior Ice Hockey League. The team is controlled by the Victorian Ice Hockey Association. On 14 October 2012 it was announced that former Australian player Doug Stevenson had signed on as coach for the 2012–13 AJIHL season.

The Melbourne Blackhawks played the first ever AJIHL game against the Sydney Lightning at the Medibank Icehouse on 21 October 2012. The Blackhawks defeated the Lightning by a score of 5-3.

The first goal ever scored in the AJIHL was by Daniel Pataky of the Sydney Lightning.
The first team in club history:
For the 2012–13 AJIHL season

AJIHL expansion

The follow up season in the Australian Junior Ice Hockey League saw a lot of change via expansion and renaming of its existing teams. The Melbourne Blackhawks were renamed the Melbourne Whalers in September 2013. The changes were made in response to the National Hockey Leagues concern about the AJIHL using their team names and logos but also recognised the opportunity to create a new history for the teams through creating their own identity. In October 2013 the league expanded to six teams with two teams from Perth, the Sharks and the Pelicans, joining for the start of the 2013–14 season.

Logo and uniform

2012-2013 Melbourne Black Hawks
In their first year, and the inaugural AJIHL season, the Melbourne Blackhawks wore a uniform that resembled the NHL namesake Chicago Blackhawks. The jersey design and uniform bore close resemblance to the Chicago Blackhawks design, with the AJIHL logo used for shoulder crests.
On August 22, 2013 it was announced that the Melbourne Blackhawks would change their name to the Melbourne Whalers, which avoided the close resemblance with the Chicago of the NHL after the NHL had made complaint about a breach of copyright and it also allowed the team to develop its own brand identity.

On September 13, 2013, the new Melbourne Whalers logo design and branding was created by Ross Carpenter and his son, Jack Carpenter, who was largely involved in the creation of the uniform design.

The suggestion to use Whalers as a new name for the Melbourne Blachawks was made by Wayne McBride as an honor to the modern day Melbourne Coat of Arms, which has black and blue spouting whale. The Australian Junior Ice Hockey League selected a new colour scheme which was a watery blue and green.

Season by season results

Players

Current roster

For the 2015–16 AJIHL season

Captains

The first team Captain for the Melbourne Blackhawks in the inaugural year for the AJIHL was Marcus Wong, his Alt Captains were Jack Carpenter and Austin McKenzie.

 2012-13 Marcus Wong (C), Jack Carpenter (A), Austin McKenzie (A)
 2013-14 Austin McKenzie (C), Christopher Wong (A),
 2015-16 Harrison Jaunozols (C)

Head coaches
The first Head Coach for the Melbourne Blackhawks in the inaugural year for the AJIHL was Doug Stevenson.
 2012-13 Doug Stevenson
 2013-14 Michael Flaherty
 2014-15 Michael Flaherty

See also

Australian Junior Ice Hockey League
Sydney Sabres
Sydney Wolf Pack
Melbourne Glaciers
Perth Pelicans
Perth Sharks
Ice Hockey Australia
Ice Hockey New South Wales
Australian Women's Ice Hockey League
Australian Ice Hockey League
Jim Brown Trophy
Goodall Cup
Joan McKowen Memorial Trophy

References

Australian Junior Ice Hockey League
Sporting clubs in Melbourne
Ice hockey teams in Australia
2012 establishments in Australia
Ice hockey clubs established in 2012
Sport in the City of Melbourne (LGA)